Quartermaster John Ditzenback (born 1828) was an American soldier who fought in the American Civil War. He was honored with the award on 22 June 1865.

Biography
Ditzenback was born in New York, New York in 1828. He enlisted into the United States Navy.

Medal of Honor citation

See also

List of American Civil War Medal of Honor recipients: A–F

References

1828 births
People of Indiana in the American Civil War
Union Navy officers
United States Navy Medal of Honor recipients
American Civil War recipients of the Medal of Honor
Year of death missing